The Dragonfly Is Not an Insect (US title The Games Men Play) is a 1963 Argentine drama film directed by Daniel Tinayre. It was entered into the 3rd Moscow International Film Festival.

Cast
Amelia Bence
Elsa Daniel
Mirtha Legrand
Malvina Pastorino
José Cibrián
Narciso Ibáñez Menta
Ángel Magaña
Luis Sandrini
Enrique Serrano
Guillermo Bredeston
Myriam de Urquijo
Héctor Calcaño
Miguel Ligero
Oscar Valicelli
Lucio Deval
Julio De Grazia
Teresa Blasco
Diana Ingro
Leda Zanda

References

External links 
 
 

1963 films
1963 drama films
1960s Spanish-language films
Argentine black-and-white films
Films directed by Daniel Tinayre
1960s Argentine films